This is a list of football games played by the Uzbekistan national football team from 2020 to present.

2020

2021

2022

See also
 Uzbekistan national football team
 Uzbekistan national football team results (1992–99)
 Uzbekistan national football team results (2000–09)
 Uzbekistan national football team results (2010–19)
 Uzbekistan national football team results – B Matches

References

External links

2020
2020s in Uzbekistani sport